Cyclotetradecaheptaene, often referred to as [14]annulene, is a hydrocarbon with molecular formula C14H14, which played an important role in the development of criteria (Hückel's rule) for aromaticity, a stabilizing property of central importance in physical organic chemistry. It forms dark-red needle-like crystals.

Structure and aromaticity 
Although the conjugated ring of [14]annulene contains 4n+2 electrons, it only exhibits limited evidence for being aromatic.  It does not fully conform to Hückel's rule because none of its cis/trans isomers can adopt a completely planar conformation due to crowding of the interior hydrogens. There is evidence that it has two isomeric forms of comparable stability (trans, cis, trans, cis, trans, trans, cis- with four interior hydrogens (shown in the infobox) and trans, cis, trans, cis, trans, cis, cis- with three interior hydrogens) which rapidly interconvert at room temperature but can be observed at low temperature by NMR.  Its 1H NMR spectrum shows evidence of aromatic ring currents that result in an upfield shift for the interior hydrogens.  In contrast, the corresponding [12]- and [16]annulenes, which are weakly antiaromatic or nonaromatic, have downfield shifted interior hydrogens.  However, unlike the undoubtedly aromatic [18]annulene, [14]annulene does not bear the hallmark aromatic property of chemical stability, and it quickly decomposes when exposed to light and air.

References

Annulenes